The Minetta Lane Theatre is a 391-seat off-Broadway theatre on Minetta Lane in the Greenwich Village neighborhood of lower Manhattan, New York City.

Significant productions include Marvin's Room in 1992, Jeffrey in 1994, and The Last Five Years in 2002.

In June 2018, British playwright Dennis Kelly's one-woman play Girls & Boys, directed by Lyndsey Turner and starring Carey Mulligan, had a run at the Minetta, to good reviews, after premiering at the Royal Court Theatre  in London in February of that year.

The theatre is owned by Liberty Theatres, a subsidiary of Reading International, who also own the Orpheum in the East Village, Manhattan. Audiobook company Audible produces shows at the theatre.

References

External links
Minetta Lane Theatre on the Lortel Archives

Theatres in Manhattan
Off-Broadway theaters
Greenwich Village